Frederick Etchells (14 September 1886 – 16 August 1973) was an English artist and architect.

Biography 

Etchells was born in Newcastle upon Tyne.

He was a contributor to the Omega Workshops, but was one of those breaking away with Wyndham Lewis; this breakaway began the Rebel Art Centre, with the Rebel Art Movement, somewhat akin to the Dadaists in Paris. The Rebel Art Movement transformed into the Vorticists several of his illustrations appeared in the issues of the literary magazine BLAST of which there were only two issues. There was a Manifesto, which not all of the artists involved signed up to; Etchells himself excluded his name from the manifesto. However William Roberts later painted Etchells holding the copy of BLAST in his work "The Vorticists at the Restaurant de la Tour Eiffel, Spring 1915". Roberts wrote to Etchells wanting to confront Lewis about his prominence in the authorship of the magazine, to which Etchells declined since he no longer wanted anything to do with it. He, unlike many of the others from the Vorticists, remained acquainted with Roger Fry.

In his architectural practice, Etchells produced some modernist buildings, the most well known of which are his designs for 232–4 High Holborn, London (1929–30) for the advertising firm WS Crawford Ltd., a commission he had obtained through his friend Ashley Havinden (1903–73) who was the company’s art director from 1929.  This was the first fully modernist office building in central London. Its clean façade was matched by a modern interior, complete with built-in furniture and stainless steel.  Etchells's main responsibility was the façade.

Etchells's most significant work is his translation of Le Corbusier's Vers une architecture known in its English title as Towards a New Architecture: This has now been re-translated by John Goodman in his version Toward an Architecture 2007. Etchells later translated another book of Corbusier's Urbanisme, which in its English translation became The City of Tomorrow. He gradually moved into architecture after a period of book publication, with the Haslewood Press. Later he became a church and conservation architect. He had close associations with John Betjeman who wrote his obituary. Betjeman was a tenant in one of Etchells's flats in Mayfair, this was during the period when Betjeman was a journalist with The Architectural Review. One of his restorations was St Andrew's Church, Plymouth; he also restored St George's Church, Donnington, West Sussex after a fire in 1939, and St James's Church, Abinger Common, Surrey in 1950 after bomb damage during World War II.

He contributed articles to the journal The Studio., though often anonymously and to Artwork.

He was an active member of the Society for the Protection of Ancient Buildings (SPAB) and a founding member of the Georgian Group.

In the 1930s Etchells purchased a weekend cottage in West Challow then called Holme Lea, a Queen Anne property.  He lived there between 1939 and 1944, having moved out of London.  During that time he acquired and renovated a second smaller house in West Challow into which he, his wife and daughter moved in 1944.

He was married to Hester Margaret Sainsbury who was a book illustrator, painter and artist known for her performances to music.

References

Sources 
Aldham, Dinah Frederick Etchells, Artist and Architect. London, Architectural Association (dissertation), 1977.
Dickson, Malcolm. Etchells (1886–1973). London, Architectural Association Library (thesis), 2005.https://aaschool.academia.edu/MalcolmDickson
Ind, Rosy & Wilson, Andrew "Frederick Etchells: Plain Homebuilder Where is your Vortex?" International Centrum voor Structuranalyse en Constructivisme. (ICSAC) Cahier 9/9: Vorticism. Brussels: 1988.  

1886 births
1973 deaths
20th-century English painters
English male painters
Architects from Northumberland
Vorticists
Conservation architects
Group X
20th-century English male artists